The 2010 AFC Cup Final was a football match played on Saturday, 6 November 2010 between Al-Qadsia and Al-Ittihad. It was the 7th final of the AFC Cup. The game was played at Jaber International Stadium, Kuwait City.

Both finalists were eligible to compete in the play-offs for the 2011 AFC Champions League, subject to AFC's assessment for professionalism based on selected criteria.

Al-Ittihad won the game after penalties. The game was tied 1–1 after regular time and Extra Time. It was their first title.

Background
Both teams met already in the preliminary round. The first game ended in a scoreless draw, while Al-Qadsia won the second match 3–0, but in the second match it was already known that both sides would advance. Both teams had a hard time surviving the first knockout-stage where Al-Qadsia needed extra time to beat the Indian club Churchill Brothers while Al-Ittihad drew Al-Kuwait 1–1 after 120 minutes and won 5–4 after penalties. In the quarterfinals both teams had no bigger problems to advance to the semifinals. Al-Ittihad lost the first leg in the semifinals 0–1 against Muangthong United F.C. from Thailand but came back to win the second leg at home 2–0. 
Al-Qadsia lost the first leg 2–0 and was in need of a comeback at home. In the second leg they defeated Al-Riffa 4–1 and advanced to the final.

Route to the final

Details

See also
2010 AFC Cup
2010 AFC Champions League Final
2010 AFC President's Cup Final

References

Final, 2010 Afc Cup
AFC Cup finals
AFC Cup Final 2010
International club association football competitions hosted by Kuwait